The Huasi Mosque is a mosque in China built during the reign of the Chenghua Emperor (r. 1465–1487) in the Ming dynasty. Buddhist temples and imperial palaces were the architecture on which the construction for the mosque was based. It was constructed by Muslims living in West Phoenix Wood Town, now the Bafang areas of Linxia City, Gansu. Ma Zhongying's 1928 revolt in the Muslim conflict in Gansu (1927–30) led to a blaze that destroyed the building. It was capable of holding 2,000 people being 5 mu in area after reconstruction of the Mosque in 1941.

See also
 Islam in China
 List of mosques in China

References

15th-century mosques
Linxia Hui Autonomous Prefecture
Ming dynasty architecture
Mosques in Gansu